Vienna High School is a public four-year high school  located in  Vienna, Illinois. VHS serves approximately 356 students  in Vienna HSD 133, which covers 300 square miles in Johnson County. Feeder schools include Buncombe, Cypress, New Simpson Hill, and Vienna grade schools.

VHS was founded in the 19th century and had its first graduating class in 1895.

In 2016, the Illinois Clean Energy Community Foundation and the USDA partnered with VHS to install free solar panels at the school for students to get hands-on training and certification to install solar panels.

Athletics 
David Hill serves as the Athletic Director.

Baseball 
David Hill serves as the baseball coach at Vienna High school and has served in the role since 2003-04 season.  His career record following the 2018-2019 season stands at 235-227 with 2 Regional Championships to his credit.  All-time, the program is 1192-749 dating back to 1952 with 9 Regional Titles, 1 Sectional, and 1 State Finals appearance in 1978.

Notable alumni 

Bob Shoemaker, Illinois Coaches Association Softball Hall of Fame Inductee 2010.

References

Public high schools in Illinois
Education in Johnson County, Illinois